The First Wisconsin Legislature convened from June 5, 1848, to August 21, 1848, in regular session. Members of the Assembly and Senate were elected after an election on February 1, 1848, that ratified the proposed state constitution.

Major events

 May 8, 1848: Nelson Dewey elected Governor of Wisconsin.
 May 29, 1848: Wisconsin was admitted to the Union as the 30th State.
 June 7, 1848: Inauguration of Nelson Dewey as the first Governor of Wisconsin.
 June 8, 1848: The Wisconsin Legislature, in joint session, elected Henry Dodge and Isaac P. Walker as United States Senators.
 November 7, 1848: Zachary Taylor elected President of the United States.  Wisconsin's electoral votes went to his opponent, Lewis Cass.

Major legislation

 June 21, 1848: Joint resolution relative to free territory, 1848 Joint Resolutions p.285
 June 21, 1848: Act concerning the Attorney General, 1848 Acts pp.10-11
 June 29, 1848: Act to prescribe the duties of the State Treasurer, 1848 Acts pp.13-15
 June 29, 1848: Act to divide the State of Wisconsin into Congressional Districts, 1848 Acts pp.15-16
 June 29, 1848: Act to provide for the election of Judges and for the classification and organization of the Judiciary of the State of Wisconsin, 1848 Acts pp.19-24
 July 26, 1848: Act to establish the University of Wisconsin, 1848 Acts pp.37-40
 July 29, 1848: Act to Exempt a Homestead from forced sale, 1848 Acts pp.40-41
 August 8, 1848: Act to incorporate the City of Racine in the county of Racine, 1848 Acts pp.80-100
 August 12, 1848: Act prescribing the powers and duties of the Secretary of State, 1848 Acts pp.115-120
 August 16, 1848: Act to provide for the Election and define the duties of State Superintendent of Public Instruction, 1848 Acts pp.127-129
 August 21, 1848: Act to provide for holding general and special Elections, the time when, the manner of holding the same, and the qualifications, disabilities, and privileges of electors, 1848 Acts pp.191-207
 August 21, 1848: Act in relation to Public Schools, 1848 Acts pp.226-247

Party summary

Senate summary

Assembly summary

Sessions
 1st Regular session: June 4, 1848August 21, 1848

Leaders

Senate leadership
 President of the Senate: John E. Holmes, Lieutenant Governor

Assembly leadership
 Speaker of the Assembly: Ninian E. Whiteside

Members

Members of the Senate
Members of the Wisconsin Senate for the First Wisconsin Legislature (19):

Members of the Assembly
Members of the Assembly for the First Wisconsin Legislature (66):

Employees
 Enrolling Clerk: Aaron V. Fryer

Senate employees
 Chief Clerk: Henry G. Abbey
 Writer: R. L. Ream
 Writer: Henry Lines
 Writer: E. P. Lockhart
 Sergeant-at-Arms: Lyman H. Seaver
 Chaplain: H. W. Reed

Assembly employees
 Chief Clerk: Daniel Noble Johnson
 Chief Clerk pro tem: L. F. Kellogg
 Assistant Clerk: T. A. B. Boyd
 Writer: Ira W. Bird
 Writer: James Murdock
 Messenger: Henry Starks
 Doorkeeper: Samuel Parkhurst
 Sergeant-at-Arms: John Mullanphy
 Chaplain: John Penman
 Chaplain: Charles Lord

References

External links
 Wisconsin Legislature website
 Acts of the 1848 Wisconsin Legislature

1848 in Wisconsin
Wisconsin
Wisconsin legislative sessions